This is a list of currently active horse racing venues (Thoroughbred racing and harness racing), sorted by country. In most English-speaking countries they are called "racecourses"; the United States and some parts of Canada use "racetracks" (some parts of Canada also use "raceway"). In many non-English speaking countries the term used is "hippodrome".

Antigua
Cassada Gardens Race Track, St Johns

Argentina
 Hipódromo 27 de Abril, Santiago del Estero, Santiago del Estero Provience 
 Hipódromo Argentino de Palermo, Buenos Aires
 Hipódromo Córdoba, Córdoba, Córdoba Province
 Hipódromo de La Plata, La Plata, Buenos Aires Province
 Hipódromo de Rosario, Rosario, Santa Fe Province
 Hipódromo de San Isidro, San Isidro, Buenos Aires Province
 Hipódromo de Tucumán, San Miguel de Tucaman, Tucaman Province

Australia
There are over 360 registered racecourses in Australia where Thoroughbred racing takes place during about 3,050 race meetings. There are also a number of separate harness racing tracks.

Thoroughbred racing
 Albury Racing club, Albury, New South Wales
 Armidale Jockey Club, Armidale, New South Wales
 Ascot Racecourse, Perth, Western Australia
 Bairnsdale Racecourse, Bairnsdale, Victoria
 Ballarat Turf Club, Ballarat, Victoria
 Balnarring Racecourse, Balnarring, Victoria 
 Belmont Park Racecourse, Perth, Western Australia
 Bendigo Racecourse, Bendigo, Victoria
 Broadmeadow Racecourse, Newcastle, New South Wales
 Callaghan Park, Rockhampton, Queensland
 Camperdown Racecourse, Camperdown, Victoria
 Canberra Racecourse, Canberra, Australian Capital Territory
 Canterbury Park Racecourse, Sydney, New South Wales
 Caulfield Racecourse, Melbourne, Victoria
 Clare Valley Racecourse, Clare, South Australia
 Clifford Park Racecourse, Toowoomba, Queensland
 Cluden Racecourse, Townsville, Queensland
 Cranbourne Racecourse, Cranbourne, Victoria 
 Dingo Racecourse, Dingo, Queensland
 Doomben Racecourse, Brisbane, Queensland
 Eagle Farm Racecourse, Brisbane, Queensland
 The Entertainment Grounds, Gosford, New South Wales (formerly Gosford Race Club)
 Flemington Racecourse, Melbourne, Victoria
 Geelong Racecourse, Geelong, Victoria
 Hamilton Racecourse, Hamilton, Victoria 
 Hawkesbury Race Club, Richmond, New South Wales
 Kalgoorlie-Boulder Racing Club, Kalgoorlie, Western Australia
 Kembla Grange Racecourse, Wollongong, New South Wales
 Lismore Turf Club, Lismore, New South Wales
 Moe Racecourse, Moe, Victoria
 Moonee Valley Racecourse, Melbourne, Victoria
 Mornington Racecourse, Mornington, Victoria
 Morphettville Racecourse, Adelaide, South Australia
 Randwick Racecourse, Sydney, New South Wales
 Rosehill Racecourse, Sydney, New South Wales
 Sale Racecourse, Sale, Victoria
 Sandown Racecourse, Melbourne, Victoria
 Seymour Racing Club, Seymour, Victoria
 Shoalhaven City Turf Club, Nowra, New South Wales
 Sunshine Coast Turf Club, Caloundra, Queensland
 Tamworth Jockey Club, Tamworth, New South Wales
 Terang Racecourse, Terang, Victoria 
 Traralgon Racecourse, Traralgon, Victoria 
 Wagga Racecourse, Wagga Wagga, New South Wales
 Walcha Jockey Club, Walcha, New South Wales
 Wangaratta Racecourse, Wangaratta, Victoria 
 Warrnambool Racecourse, Warrnambool, Victoria 
 Warwick Farm Racecourse, Sydney, New South Wales
 Wodonga Racecourse, Wodonga, Victoria
 Wyong Race Club, Wyong, New South Wales

Harness racing
 Albion Park Racecourse, Brisbane, Queensland
 Geelong Harness Racing Club, Geelong, Victoria 
 Gloucester Park, Perth, Western Australia
 Menangle Park Paceway, Menangle Park, New South Wales
 Terang Harness Racing Club, Terang, Victoria

Austria
 Magna Racino, Ebreichsdorf (near Vienna)
 Trabrennbahn Baden, Baden bei Wien (near Vienna)
 Trabrennbahn Krieau, Vienna
 Galopprennbahn Freudenau, Vienna (only one raceday per year always in September)
 Welser Trabrennbahn, Wels

Bahrain
 Rashid Equestrian and Horseracing Club, Riffa

Barbados
 Garrison Savannah Race Track, Bridgetown

Belgium
 Hippodroom de Kuurne, Kuurne
 Hippodrome de Wallonie, Mons–Ghlin
 Hippodroom Tongeren, Tongeren
 Hippodroom Waregem, Waregem
 Hippodrome Wellington, Ostend

Brazil
 Hipódromo da Gávea, Rio de Janeiro
 Hipodromo de Cidade Jardim, São Paulo
 Hipodromo do Cristal, Porto Alegre
 Hipodromo do Taruma, Curitiba
Other racetracks exist in  Recife (PE),  Pelotas (RS), Goiânia, (GO), Sao Vicente (SP), and Campos dos Goytacazes (RJ).

Canada

Thoroughbred racing

Alberta
 Century Downs Racetrack and Casino, Calgary
 Evergreen Park, Grande Prairie
 Century Mile, Edmonton
 Rocky Mountain Turf Club, Lethbridge
 The Track on 2, Lacombe

British Columbia
 Hastings Racecourse, Vancouver

Manitoba
 Assiniboia Downs, Winnipeg

Ontario
 Ajax Downs, Ajax
 Fort Erie Race Track, Fort Erie
 Woodbine Racetrack, Toronto

Harness racing

Alberta
 Century Downs Racetrack and Casino, Calgary
 Century Mile Racetrack and Casino, Edmonton
 The Track on 2, Lacombe

British Columbia
 Fraser Downs, Surrey

New Brunswick
 Exhibition Park Raceway, Saint John

Nova Scotia
 Inverness Raceway, Inverness
 Northside Downs, North Sydney
 Truro Raceway, Truro

Quebec
 Hippodrome 3R, Trois-Rivières

Ontario
 Clinton Raceway, Clinton
 Dresden Raceway, Dresden
 Flamboro Downs, Flamborough
 Georgian Downs, Innisfil
 Grand River Raceway, Elora
 Hanover Raceway, Hanover
 Hiawatha Horse Park, Sarnia
 Kawartha Downs, Fraserville
 Leamington Raceway, Leamington
 Rideau Carleton Raceway, Ottawa
 The Raceway at Western Fair, London
 Woodbine Mohawk Park, Campbellville

Prince Edward Island
 Charlottetown Driving Park, Charlottetown
 Summerside Raceway, Summerside

China

 Inner Mongolia Racecourse Hohhot
 Conghua Racecourse Guangzhou 
 Ordos Yiqi Racecourse Ordos
 Orient Lucky City Racecourse Wuhan

Chile

 Club Hípico de Concepción, Concepción, Bio-Bio Region
 Club Hípico de Santiago, Santiago
 Hipódromo Chile, Santiago
 Valparaiso Sporting Club, Viña del Mar, Valparaíso Region

Colombia
 Hipodromo Villa de Leyva, Villa de Leyva

Croatia
 Zagreb Hippodrome, Zagreb

Cyprus
 Nicosia Race Club, Nicosia

Czech Republic
 Dostihové závodiště Albertovec, Albertovec
 Dostihové závodiště Benešov, Benešov
 Dostihové závodiště Brno, Brno
 Dostihové závodiště Karlovy Vary, Karlovy Vary
 Dostihové závodiště Kolesa, Kolesa
 Dostihové závodiště Lysá nad Labem, Lysá nad Labem
 Dostihové závodiště Mimoň, Mimoň
 Dostihové závodiště Pardubice, Pardubice (site of the Velká pardubická)
 Dostihové závodiště Praha-Velká Chuchle, Prague
 Dostihové závodiště Netolice, Netolice
 Dostihové závodiště Radslavice, Radslavice
 Dostihové závodiště Slušovice, Slušovice
 Dostihové závodiště Světlá Hora, Světlá Hora
 Dostihové závodiště Tochovice, Tochovice
 Hipodrom Most, Most

Denmark 
 Nykøbing F. Travbane, Nykøbing F.
 Billund Trav, Billund
 Bornholms Brand Park, on The Island Bornholm in the Baltic sea. (Harness Racing) the smallest racetrack in the World.
 Charlottenlund Racetrack, Copenhagen (site of Copenhagen Cup) 
 Fyens Væddeløbsbane, Odense
 Jydsk Væddeløbsbane, Aarhus
 Klampenborg Racecourse, Copenhagen 
 NKI Racing Arena, Aalborg
 Skive Trav, Skive

Dominican Republic 
 Hipodromo V Centenario, Santo Domingo

Estonia
 Tallinna Hipodroom, Tallinn

Finland

 Äimärautio, Oulu 
 Killeri, Jyväskylä
 Jokimaa, Lahti 
 Kajaani Track, Kajaani 
 Keskinen, Ylivieska
 Kouvola Track, Kouvola
 Laivakangas, Tornio
 Lappee, Lappeenranta
 Linnunlahti, Joensuu
 Mäntyvaara, Rovaniemi 
 Metsämäki, Turku
 Mikkeli Track, Mikkeli
 Nikula, Kaustinen
 Pilvenmäki, Forssa 
 Pori Track, Pori 
 Seinäjoki Track, Seinäjoki 
 Sorsasalo, Kuopio 
 Teivo, Ylöjärvi (near Tampere)
 Tornio Track, Tornio
 Vaasa Track, Vaasa
 Vermo, Espoo (near Helsinki)

France

Half of European horse racing venues are in France (with more than 250 current operating hippodromes).

 Chantilly Racecourse, Chantilly
 Deauville-Clairefontaine Racecourse, Deauville
 Deauville-La Touques Racecourse, Deauville
 Hippodrome d'Auteuil, Auteuil, Paris
 Hippodrome de Bellerive, Vichy
 Hippodrome de Cabourg, Cabourg
 Hippodrome de la Côte d'Azur, Cagnes-sur-Mer
 Hippodrome de la Prairie, Caen
 Hippodrome de la Solle, Fontainebleau
 Hippodrome de Vincennes, Vincennes (vicinity of Paris)
 Hippodrome d'Enghien-Soisy, Enghien (vicinity of Paris)
 Hippodrome du putois, Compiègne
 Longchamp Racecourse, Paris (site of Prix de l'Arc de Triomphe)
 Maisons-Laffitte Racecourse, Maisons-Laffitte (vicinity of Paris)
 Marseille Borely Racecourse, Marseille
 Saint-Cloud Racecourse, Saint-Cloud (vicinity of Paris)

Alsace
 Hippodrome de la Hardt, Wissembourg
 Hippodrome de Strasbourg-Hoerdt, Hoerdt

Aquitaine 
 Hippodrome de Cantereaux, Libourne
 Hippodrome de Castagnolles, Bazas
 Hippodrome de la Bidanne, Fargues
 Hippodrome de la Garenne, Agen
 Hippodrome de Laloubère, Tarbes
 Hippodrome de Pont-Long, Pau
 Hippodrome de Saint-Paul-les-Dax, Dax
 Hippodrome de Sarlande, Castillonnès
 Hippodrome des fleurs, Biarritz
 Hippodrome des Grands Pins, Mont-de-Marsan
 Hippodrome du Béquet, La Teste de Buch
 Hippodrome du Bouscat, Le Bouscat (banlieue de Bordeaux)
 Hippodrome de Pesquie-Bas, Villeréal
 Hippodrome de Sangruère, Villeneuve-sur-Lot

Auvergne
 Hippodrome de Bellerive, Vichy
 Hippodrome des gateaux, Moulins
 Hippodrome Georges du Breil, Aurillac
 Hippodrome Saint-Jean, Montluçon

Brittany 
 Hippodrome de Cano, Vannes
 Hippodrome de Croas-al-Leuriou, Landivisiau
 Hippodrome de Kerret, Guerlesquin
 Hippodrome de Kernivinen, Pontivy
 Hippodrome de la Baie, Saint-Brieuc
 Hippodrome de la Baie du Kernic, Plouescat
 Hippodrome de la grande marche, Fougères
 Hippodrome de la Plage Saint-Sieu, Lancieux
 Hippodrome de la Rive, Redon
 Hippodrome de Langolvas, Morlaix
 Hippodrome de Marville, Saint-Malo
 Hippodrome de Saint-Efflam, Plestin-les-Grèves
 Hippodrome des Bruyères, Maure-de-Bretagne
 Hippodrome du bel orme, Guingamp
 Hippodrome du Petit Paris, Corlay
 Hippodrome du Resto, Questembert

Burgundy 
 Hippodrome de Cluny, Mâcon
 Hippodrome de la Varenne, Paray-le-Monial
 Hippodrome de Marcilly, Vitteaux

Centre 
 Hippodrome de Chartres, Chartres
 Hippodrome de Dreux, Dreux
 Hippodrome de Grigny, Chinon
 Hippodrome de la Ferté Vidame
 Hippodrome de Lignières, Lignières
 Hippodrome de l'Île Arrault, Orléans
 Hippodrome de Tours-Chambray, Tours
 Hippodrome du Petit-Valençay, Châteauroux

Champagne-Ardenne 
 Hippodrome de la Champagne, Reims
 Hippodrome de la Crouée, Montier-en-Der

Corsica 
 Hippodrome de Calzarellu, Prunelli-di-Fiumorbo
 Hippodrome de Casatorra, Biguglia
 Hippodrome de Viseo, Zonza
 Hippodrome des Vignetta, Ajaccio

Franche-Comté 
 Hippodrome de Comberjon, Vesoul

Île-de-France 

 Hippodrome d'Auteuil, Paris
 Hippodrome de Fontainebleau, Fontainebleau
 Hippodrome de Grosbois, Boissy-Saint-Léger (banlieue of Paris), for the qualification of trotters in a training centre
 Hippodrome de Longchamp, Paris
 Hippodrome de Maisons-Laffitte, Maisons-Laffitte (banlieue of Paris)
 Hippodrome de Rambouillet, Rambouillet (banlieue of Paris)
 Hippodrome de Saint-Cloud, Saint-Cloud (banlieue of Paris)
 Hippodrome de Vincennes, Paris
 Hippodrome d'Enghien-Soisy, Enghien-les-Bains and Soisy-sous-Montmorency (banlieue of Paris)

Languedoc-Roussillon 
 Hippodrome de la Fajeolle, Carcassonne
 Hippodrome des Courbiers, Nîmes

Limousin 
 Hippodrome de La Sagne, Le Dorat
 Hippodrome de Pompadour, Arnac-Pompadour
 Hippodrome de Texonnieras, Limoges

Lorraine 
 Hippodrome de Nancy-Brabois, Vandœuvre-lès-Nancy (banlieue of Nancy)
 Hippodrome de Vittel, Vittel

Lower Normandy 

 Trotting racetracks (ranked by Cheval Français)
 National Centre: 
 Hippodrome de Cabourg, Cabourg
 Regional Centres:
 Hippodrome d'Argentan, Argentan
 Hippodrome de la Prairie, Caen
 Hippodrome du vieux Château, Graignes
 Class 1:
 Hippodrome de Deauville – Clairefontaine, Deauville
 Hippodrome de la Glacerie, La Glacerie (banlieue de Cherbourg)
 Hippodrome de la Trésorerie, Lisieux
 Hippodrome Maurice-Jan, Moidrey (près du Mont Saint-Michel)
 Hippodrome Robert Auvray, Vire
 Class 2:
 Hippodrome d'Alençon, Alençon
 Hippodrome de Carentan la Russie, Carentan
 Hippodrome de Sautchevreuil, Villedieu-les-Poêles
 Hippodrome du Martinet, Agon-Coutainville
 Hippodrome Gabriel Lefranc, Bréhal
 Class 3:
 Hippodrome d'Avranches, Avranches
 Hippodrome de Bagnoles-de-l'Orne, Bagnoles-de-l'Orne
 Hippodrome de Bourigny, La Chapelle-Cécelin
 Hippodrome de la Cale, Jullouville
 Hippodrome de la Croix des Landes, Domfront
 Hippodrome de la Couperée, Dozulé
 Hippodrome de la Dives, Saint-Pierre-sur-Dives
 Hippodrome de La Fontaine, Le Sap
 Hippodrome de la Madeleine, Hiesville (près de Sainte-Marie-du-Mont)
 Hippodrome de Longueville-Bréville, Granville
 Hippodrome de Rânes, Rânes
 Hippodrome de Valognes, Valognes
 Hippodrome des Grèves, Genêts
 Hippodrome Jean-Gabin, Moulins-la-Marche
 Hippodrome Les Pins, Portbail
Unclassified and non-trotting racetracks:
 Hippodrome de Deauville-La Touques, Deauville
 Hippodrome de la Bergerie, Le Pin-au-Haras
 Hippodrome du Perche, Mortagne-au-Perche

Martinique 
Hippodrome de Carrère, Le Lamentin

Midi-Pyrénées 
 Hippodrome de Borde-Vieille, Beaumont-de-Lomagne
 Hippodrome de la Cépière, Toulouse
 Hippodrome de la Ribère, Auch
 Hippodrome de Laloubère, Tarbes
 Hippodrome de Marches, Castelsarrasin
 Hippodrome de Marianne, Grenade
 Hippodrome des Allègres, Montauban
 Hippodrome du Baron, Castéra-Verduzan
 Hippodrome du Tumulus, Gramat

Nord-Pas-de-Calais 
 Hippodrome de la Canche, Le Touquet
 Hippodrome de la Mollière, Beutin
 Hippodrome des Bruyères, Saint-Omer
 Hippodrome des Flandres (also known as Hippodrome du Croisé-Laroche), Marcq-en-Barœul (banlieue of Lille)
 Hippodrome des Hauts-Blancs-Monts, Arras

Pays de Loire 

 Hippodrome de Beaumont, Nort-sur-Erdre
 Hippodrome de Bellevue-la-Forêt, Laval
 Hippodrome de Clenet, Cholet
 Hippodrome de Fontenailles, Écommoy
 Hippodrome de la Bretonnière, Meslay-du-Maine
 Hippodrome de La Carrière, Durtal
 Hippodrome de l'Atlantique, Saint-Jean-de-Monts
 Hippodrome de la Loire, Cordemais
 Hippodrome de la Loire, Segré
 Hippodrome de la Malbrande, Les Sables-d'Olonne
 Hippodrome de la Métairie neuve, Châteaubriant
 Hippodrome de la prairie du château, Sablé-sur-Sarthe
 Hippodrome de La Touche, Craon
 Hippodrome de l'Isle-Briand, Le Lion-d'Angers
 Hippodrome de Pornichet, Pornichet
 Hippodrome de Portillon, Vertou
 Hippodrome de Verrie, Saumur
 Hippodrome des Chaumes, Machecoul
 Hippodrome des Hunaudières, Le Mans
 Hippodrome des Senonnettes, Senonnes–Pouancé
 Hippodrome d'Éventard, Angers
 Hippodrome du calvaire de la Magdeleine, Pontchâteau
 Hippodrome du Petit Port, Nantes
 Hippodrome les Noues, Challans

Picardy 
 Hippodrome d'Ardon, Laon
 Hippodrome de Chantilly, Chantilly (banlieue of Paris)
 Hippodrome de la prairie Malicorne, Merlimont (Pas-de-Calais)
 Hippodrome de la Thiérache, La Capelle
 Hippodrome du petit Saint-Jean, Amiens
 Hippodrome du Putois, Compiègne

Poitou-Charentes 
 Hippodrome de la Côte de Beauté, Royan
 Hippodrome de la Gatinière, La Roche-Posay
 Hippodrome de la Tourette, Angoulême
 Hippodrome de Mansle, Mansle
 Hippodrome de Romagne, Niort
 Hippodrome de Villeneuve, Thouars
 Hippodrome du Haut-Rillon, La Rochelle

Provence-Alpes-Côte d'Azur 

 Hippodrome de Déffends, à Sault
 Hippodrome de la Côte d'Azur, Cagnes-sur-Mer
 Hippodrome de la Crau, Salon-de-Provence
 Hippodrome de la Durance, Cavaillon
 Hippodrome de la Levade, Bollène
 Hippodrome de Saint-Ponchon, Carpentras
 Hippodrome de la plage, Hyères
 Hippodrome Marseille Borély, Marseille
 Hippodrome Marseille Vivaux, Marseille
 Hippodrome Roberty, Avignon
 Hippodrome Saint-Gervais, L'Isle-sur-la-Sorgue

Rhône-Alpes 

 Hippodrome André Longchamp, Divonne-les-Bains
 Hippodrome de Bel Air, Châtillon-sur-Chalaronne
 Hippodrome de Marlioz, Aix-les-Bains
 Hippodrome de Parilly, Bron (banlieue of Lyon)
 Hippodrome de Villeurbanne, Vaulx-en-Velin (banlieue of Lyon)
 Hippodrome du Parc, Feurs
 Hippodrome Joseph Desjoyaux, Saint-Galmier

Upper Normandy 
 Hippodrome de Bacqueville-en-Caux, Bacqueville-en-Caux
 Hippodrome de Bernay, Bernay
 Hippodrome de Bihorel, Bihorel
 Hippodrome de Dieppe, Dieppe
 Hippodrome de Francheville, Francheville, Eure
 Hippodrome de Gournay en Bray, Gournay en Bray
 Hippodrome de Rouen-Mauquenchy, Mauquenchy
 Hippodrome de Saint-Aubin-lès-Elbeuf, Saint-Aubin-lès-Elbeuf
 Hippodrome des Andelys, Les Andelys
 Hippodrome des Bruyères, Rouen
 Hippodrome d'Évreux, Évreux
 Hippodrome du Neubourg, Le Neubourg

Germany 
 Galopprennbahn Bad Harzburg, Bad Harzburg, Lower Saxony
 Galopprennbahn Baden-Baden – Iffezheim, Baden-Baden, Baden-Württemberg
 Galopprennbahn Cologne-Weidenpesch, Cologne, North Rhine-Westphalia
 Galopprennbahn Dortmund-Wambel, Dortmund, North Rhine-Westphalia
 Galopprennbahn Dresden-Seidnitz, Dresden, Saxony
 Galopprennbahn Düsseldorf-Grafenberg, Düsseldorf, North Rhine-Westphalia
 Galopprennbahn Halle, Halle, Saxony-Anhalt
 Galopprennbahn Hamburg-Horn, Hamburg
 Galopprennbahn Hanover-Langenhagen, Hanover, Lower Saxony
 Galopprennbahn Haßloch, Haßloch, Rhineland-Palatinate
 Galopprennbahn Herxheim, Herxheim, Rhineland-Palatinate
 Galopprennbahn Hoppegarten, Hoppegarten, Brandenburg (near Berlin)
 Galopprennbahn Krefeld, Krefeld, North Rhine-Westphalia
 Galopprennbahn Leipzig-Scheibenholz, Leipzig, Saxony
 Galopprennbahn Magdeburg-Herrenkrug, Magdeburg, Saxony-Anhalt
 Galopprennbahn Mannheim-Seckenheim, Mannheim, Baden-Württemberg
 Galopprennbahn Mülheim / Ruhr, Mülheim, North Rhine-Westphalia
 Galopprennbahn Munich-Riem, Munich, Bavaria
 Galopprennbahn Verden, Verden, Lower Saxony
 Pferdesportpark Karlshorst, Berlin
 Rennbahn Karlsruhe-Knielingen, Karlsruhe, Baden-Württemberg 
 Rennbahn Saarbrücken-Güdingen, Saarbrücken, Saarland
 Trabrennbahn Bahrenfeld, Hamburg
 Trabrennbahn Daglfing, München, Bavaria
 Trabrennbahn Dinslaken, Dinslaken, North Rhine-Westphalia
 Trabrennbahn Gelsenkirchen (GelsenTrabPark), Gelsenkirchen, North Rhine-Westphalia
 Trabrennbahn Mariendorf, Berlin
 Trabrennbahn Mönchengladbach, Mönchengladbach, North Rhine-Westphalia
 Trabrennbahn Pfarrkirchen, Pfarrkirchen, Bavaria
 Trabrennbahn Straubing, Straubing, Bavaria

Great Britain

The United Kingdom does not have a country-wide organising body for horseracing. The remit of the British Horseracing Authority does not extend to the island of Ireland; as a result, the two tracks in Northern Ireland are under the jurisdiction of Horse Racing Ireland.

England
York Harness Raceway
Flat racing
Bath Racecourse, Greater Bristol
Beverley Racecourse, East Riding of Yorkshire
Brighton Racecourse, East Sussex
Chelmsford City Racecourse, Essex
Chester Racecourse, Cheshire
Epsom Downs Racecourse, Surrey
Goodwood Racecourse, West Sussex
Great Yarmouth Racecourse, Norfolk
Newmarket Racecourses, Suffolk
Nottingham Racecourse, Nottinghamshire
Pontefract Racecourse, West Yorkshire
Redcar Racecourse, North Yorkshire
Ripon Racecourse, North Yorkshire
Salisbury Racecourse, Wiltshire
Thirsk Racecourse, North Yorkshire
Windsor Racecourse, Berkshire
Wolverhampton Racecourse, West Midlands
York Racecourse, Yorkshire

National hunt
Aintree Racecourse, Merseyside
Cartmel Racecourse, Cumbria
Cheltenham Racecourse, Gloucestershire
Exeter Racecourse, Devon
Fakenham Racecourse, Norfolk
Fontwell Park Racecourse, West Sussex
Hereford Racecourse, Herefordshire 
Hexham Racecourse, Northumberland
Huntingdon Racecourse, Cambridgeshire
Ludlow Racecourse, Shropshire
Market Rasen Racecourse, Lincolnshire
Newton Abbot Racecourse, Devon
Plumpton Racecourse, East Sussex
Sedgefield Racecourse, County Durham
Stratford-on-Avon Racecourse, Warwickshire
Taunton Racecourse, Somerset
Uttoxeter Racecourse, Staffordshire
Warwick Racecourse, Warwickshire
Wincanton Racecourse, Somerset
Worcester Racecourse, Worcestershire
Mixed
Ascot Racecourse, Berkshire
Carlisle Racecourse, Cumbria
Catterick Bridge Racecourse, North Yorkshire
Doncaster Racecourse, South Yorkshire
Haydock Park Racecourse, Merseyside
Kempton Park Racecourse, Surrey
Leicester Racecourse, Leicestershire
Lingfield Park Racecourse, Surrey
Newbury Racecourse, Berkshire
Newcastle Racecourse, Tyne and Wear
Sandown Park Racecourse, Surrey
Southwell Racecourse, Nottinghamshire
Wetherby Racecourse, West Yorkshire

Scotland
Corbiewood, Bannockburn
Ayr Racecourse, Ayrshire (mixed)
Hamilton Park Racecourse, South Lanarkshire (flat)
Kelso Racecourse, the Scottish Borders (national hunt)
Musselburgh Racecourse, East Lothian (mixed)
Perth Racecourse, Perth and Kinross (national hunt)

Wales
Bangor on Dee Racecourse, Wrexham (national hunt)
Chepstow Racecourse, Monmouthshire (mixed)
Ffos Las Racecourse, Carmarthenshire (mixed)

Channel Islands
L’ancresse Racecourse, Guernsey, flat
Les Landes Racecourse, Jersey, flat

Greece
Markopoulo Racecourse, Markopoulo Mesogaias (near Athens)

Guyana
 Alness Turf Club
 Anjoo Park
 Arima Park Turf Club
 Brighton Turf Club
 Bush Lot Sea View Park
 Kennard Memorial Turf Club
 Port Mourant Turf Club

Hong Kong
 Happy Valley Racecourse
 Sha Tin Racecourse

Hungary
 Kincsem Park, Budapest

India
 Bangalore Turf Club, Bangalore
 Chennai Race Club, Chennai, previously known as Madras, capital of the state of Tamil Nadu
 Delhi Race Club, Delhi
 Hyderabad Race Club, Hyderabad
 Mysore Race Club, Mysore
 Ooty Race Club – Ootacamund, more popularly known as Ooty, is located amidst the mountains on very picturesque surrounds, and is used especially during the summer months when racing in the warmer regions may not be possible
 Royal Calcutta Turf Club, Calcutta
 Royal Western India Turf Club, Mumbai and Pune

Ireland
Horse racing in Ireland is organised on an All-Ireland basis by Horse Racing Ireland.

In the Republic of Ireland:
 Ballinrobe Racecourse (mixed)
 Bellewstown Racecourse (mixed)
 Clonmel races (mixed)
 Cork races (mixed)
 The Curragh races, County Kildare (site of Irish Derby) (flat)
 Dundalk races (all-weather) (flat)
 Fairyhouse races (mixed)
 Galway races (mixed)
 Gowran Park races (mixed)
 Kilbeggan races (jumps only)
 Killarney races (mixed)
 Laytown races (flat)
 Leopardstown races (mixed)
 Limerick races (mixed)
 Listowel races (mixed)
 Naas races (mixed)
 Navan races (mixed)
 Punchestown races (mixed)
 Roscommon races (mixed)
 Sligo races (mixed)
 Thurles races (mixed)
 Tipperary races (mixed)
 Tralee races (mixed)
 Tramore races (mixed)
 Wexford races (National Hunt only)

In Northern Ireland:
 Down Royal races (mixed)
 Downpatrick races (mixed)

Italy

 Ippodromo Caprilli, Livorno
 Ippodromo Comunale, Ferrara
 Ippodromo Corrado Romanengo, Novi Ligure
 Ippodromo d'Abruzzo, S.Giovanni Teatino (near Chieti)
 Ippodromo dei Fiori, Albenga
 Ippodromo dei Marsi, Tagliacozzo
 Ippodromo dei Pini, Follonica
 Ippodromo dei Sauri, Castelluccio dei Sauri
 Ippodromo del Casalone, Grosseto
 Ippodromo del Garigliano, Santi Cosma e Damiano
 Ippodromo del Mediterraneo, Siracusa
 Ippodromo del Savio, Cesena
 Ippodromo del Visarno, Florence
 Ippodromo della Favorita, Palermo
 Ippodromo delle Capannelle, Rome (gallop and trot)
 Ippodromo delle Cascine, Florence
 Ippodromo di Agnano, Naples (site of Gran Premio Lotteria)
 Ippodromo di Arcoveggio, Bologna
 Ippodromo di Breda, Padua
 Ippodromo di Cirigliano, Aversa
 Ippodromo di Montebello, Trieste
 Ippodromo di San Marone, Civitanova Marche
 Ippodromo di San Rossore, Pisa
 Ippodromo di San Siro, Milan (site of Gran Premio di Milano)
 Ippodromo di Sant'Artemio, Treviso
 Ippodromo di Sesana, Montecatini Terme
 Ippodromo di Settimi, Anguillara Sabazia
 Ippodromo di Stupinigi, Vinovo (near Turin)
 Ippodromo di Valentinia, Pontecagnano
 Ippodromo Don Meloni, Ozieri
 Ippodromo Euritalia, Casarano (near Lecce)
 Ippodromo La Ghirlandina, Modena
 Ippodromo La Torricella, Capalbio (near Grosseto)
 Ippodromo Le Bettole, Varese
 Ippodromo Maia, Meran (site of Gran Premio Merano)
 Ippodromo Martini, Corridonia
 Ippodromo Paolo VI, Taranto
 Ippodromo Pian delle Fornaci, Siena
 Ippodromo Pinna, Sassari
 Ippodromo San Paolo, Montegiorgio
 Ippodromo Villa delle Rose, Lanciano
 Ippodromo Villacidro, Villacidro

Jamaica
 Caymanas Park, Kingston

Japan

Japan Racing Association

 Chukyo Racecourse
 Fukushima Racecourse
 Hakodate Racecourse
 Hanshin Racecourse
 Kokura Racecourse
 Kyoto Racecourse
 Nakayama Racecourse
 Niigata Racecourse
 Sapporo Racecourse
 Tokyo Racecourse

The National Association of Racing
 Funabashi Racecourse
 Kanazawa Racecourse
 Kasamatsu Racecourse
 Kawasaki Racecourse
 Kochi Racecourse
 Mizusawa Racecourse
 Mombetsu Racecourse
 Morioka Racecourse
 Nagoya Racecourse
 Obihiro Racecourse (ban-ei racecourse)
 Oi Racecourse
 Saga Racecourse
 Sonoda Racecourse
 Urawa Racecourse

Kazakhstan
Almaty hippodrome, Almaty

Kenya
 Ngong Racecourse, Nairobi

Lebanon
 Beirut Hippodrome, Beirut

Macau
 Taipa Racecourse, Macau

Malaysia
 Penang Turf Club, Penang
 Perak Turf Club, Ipoh 
 Selangor Turf Club, Kuala Lumpur
 Royal Sabah Turf Club, Tuaran
 Sarawak Turf Club, Kuching

Malta
 Gozo Race Track, Gozo
 Malta Racing Club, Marsa

Mauritius
 Champ de Mars Racecourse, Port Louis

Mexico
 The famous Agua Caliente Racetrack in Tijuana ceased operations as a horse racetrack and offers now greyhound racing.
 Hipódromo de las Américas, Mexico City

Morocco
 Hippodrome de Casa-Anfa, Casablanca
 Hippodrome de Settat, Settat
 Hippodrome Lalla Malika, El Jadida
 Hippodrome Rabat-Souissi, Rabat

Netherlands
 Drafbaan Groningen, Groningen
 Drafcentrum Alkmaar, Alkmaar
 Renbaan Duindigt, Duindigt (near The Hague)
 Victoria Park, Wolvega, Wolvega (near Heerenveen)

New Zealand
 Addington, Christchurch (harness racing and greyhounds)
 Alexandra Park, Auckland (harness racing)
 Ascot Park, Invercargill, Southland (gallops, harness racing and greyhounds)
 Ashburton, mid Canterbury
 Avondale, Auckland
 Awapuni, Palmerston North
 Cambridge Raceway, Cambridge (east of Hamilton) (harness racing and greyhounds)
 Cromwell, central Otago
 Dargaville, Northland
 Ellerslie Racecourse, Auckland
 Forbury Park, Dunedin (harness racing and greyhounds)
 Gisborne, Poverty Bay
 Gore, northern Southland
 Hastings, Hawkes Bay
 Hawera, south Taranaki
 Hokitika, west coast of South Island
 Kaikoura, southern Marlborough (harness racing)
 Kumara, west coast of South Island
 Kurow, north Otago
 Manawatu Raceway, Palmerston North (harness racing and greyhounds)
 Matamata, eastern Waikato
 Methven, mid Canterbury (harness racing)
 Motukarara, Banks Peninsula
 New Plymouth, Taranaki
 Oamaru, north Otago
 Omakau, central Otago
 Omoto, Greymouth, west coast of South Island
 Orari, Geraldine, south Canterbury (harness racing)
 Otaki, Kapiti Coast
 Paeroa, Hauraki Plains (now a training venue only)
 Patterson Park, Westport, Buller (harness racing)
 Phar Lap Raceway, Washdyke, Timaru, south Canterbury
 Pukekohe, Franklin district
 Rangiora, north of Christchurch
 Reefton, west coast of South Island
 Riccarton Park Racecourse, Christchurch
 Richmond, Nelson (harness racing)
 Riverton, west of Invercargill, Southland
 Rotorua, Bay of Plenty
 Roxburgh, central Otago (harness racing)
 Ruakaka, near Whangarei, Northland
 Tauherenikau, Wairarapa
 Taupo, central North Island
 Tauranga, Bay of Plenty
 Te Aroha, Thames Valley
 Te Awamutu, south of Hamilton
 Te Kapua Park, Stratford, Taranaki
 Te Rapa, Hamilton
 Te Teko, near Whakatane, eastern Bay of Plenty
 Thames, Coromandel Peninsula
 Trentham Racecourse, Upper Hutt, near Wellington
 Waikouaiti, north of Dunedin
 Waimate, south Canterbury
 Waipukurau, southern Hawkes Bay
 Wairoa, northern Hawkes Bay
 Wanganui (Whanganui), north-west of Palmerston North
 Waterlea, Blenheim, Marlborough
 Waverley, north of Wanganui
 Wingatui, Dunedin
 Winton, central Southland
 Woodville, east of Palmerston North
 Wyndham, east of Invercargill, Southland

Niger
 Hippodrome de Niamey, Niamey

Norway
 Bergen Travpark, Bergen
 Biri Travbane, Gjøvik
 Bjerke Travbane, Oslo
 Drammen Travbane, Drammen
 Forus Travbane, Stavanger
 Harstad Travpark, Harstad
 Jarlsberg Travbane, Tønsberg
 Klosterskogen Travbane, Skien
 Leangen Travbane, Trondheim
 Momarken Travbane, Eidsberg
 Øvrevoll Galoppbane, Oslo
 Sørlandets Travpark, Kristiansand

Pakistan
 Karachi Race Club, Karachi
 Lahore Race Club, Lahore

Panama
 Hipódromo Presidente Remón, Panama City

Paraguay
 Hipódromo de Asunción, Asunción

Peru
 Hipódromo de Monterrico, Lima
 Hipódromo de Porongoche, Arequipa

Philippines

 The Horsemen's Track, Padre Garcia, Batangas (underconstruction)
 Metro Manila Turf Club (Metro Turf), Malvar and Tanauan, Batangas
 Saddle and Clubs Leisure Park (Santa Ana Park), Naic, Cavite
 San Lazaro Leisure Park Turf Club, Carmona, Cavite

Poland
 Kraków Racecourse, Dąbrówka, Bochnia County
 Partynice Racecourse, Wrocław
 Służewiec Racecourse, Warszawa
 Sopot Hippodrome, Sopot

Puerto Rico
 Hipódromo Camarero, San Juan

Qatar
 Al Rayyan Race Course, Doha

Romania

 Hipodrom Craiova, Craiova
 Hipodrom Ploiești, Ploiești

Russia
 Central Moscow Hippodrome, Moscow
 Ramenskoye Ippodrom, Ramenskoye
 Kazan Ippodrom, Kazan, Tatarstan
 Naberezhnye Chelny Ippodrom, Naberezhnye Chelny, Tatarstan
 Rostov Ippodrom, Rostov-na-Donu
 Samara Ippodrom, Samara, Russia
 Akbuzat Race Track, Bashkortostan

Saint Kitts and Nevis
 Beaumont Park Race Track, Dieppe Bay, Saint Kitts 
 Indian Castle Race Track, Indian Castle, Nevis (only stages a handful of race days, almost entirely on public holidays)

Saudi Arabia
 King Abdulaziz Racetrack, Riyadh
 King Khalid Race Track, Taif

Serbia
 Hipodrom Beograd, Beograd
 Hipodrom Šabac, Šabac

Singapore
 Kranji Racecourse

Slovakia
 Zavodisko, Bratislava

South Africa

Gauteng
 Vaal Racecourse, Gauteng
 Turffontein Racecourse, Gauteng

Western Cape
 Durbanville Racecourse, Western Cape
 Kenilworth Racecourse, Western Cape
 Milnerton Racecourse, Western Cape

KwaZulu-Natal
 Scottsville Racecourse, KwaZulu-Natal
 Clairwood Racecourse, KwaZulu-Natal
 Greyville Racecourse, KwaZulu-Natal

Eastern Cape
 Fairview Racecourse, Eastern Cape

Northern Cape
 Flamingo Park, Northern Cape

South Korea
 Busan Gyeongnam Race Park, Busan
 Jeju Race Park, Jeju
 Seoul Race Park, Seoul

Spain
 Gran Hipodromo de Andalucia – Dos Hermanas, Sevilla
 Hipodrom Municipal de Manacor, Manacor, Mallorca
 Hipodrom Municipal de Mao, Mahón, Menorca
 Hipodrom Sant Rafel, San Rafael, Ibiza
 Hipodrom Son Pardo, Palma de Mallorca, Mallorca
 Hipodrom Torre del Ram, Ciudadela de Menorca, Menorca
 Hipodromo de Antela, Ourense
 Hipodromo de Donostia, San Sebastián
 Hipódromo de la Zarzuela, Madrid
 Hipodromo de Pineda, Sevilla

Sweden
 Åby Racetrack, Mölndal (near Gothenburg) (site of Olympiatravet)
 Arena Åmålstravet, Åmål
 Arena Dannero, Nyland, Sweden
 Axevalla Travbana, Axvall
 Bergsåker Travbana, Sundsvall
 Dala Travet, Rättvik
 Färjestad Travet, Karlstad
 Göteborg Galopp, Gothenburg
 Halmstad Travet, Halmstad
 Jägersro Galopp, Malmö
 Kalmar Travbana, Kalmar 
 Mantorp Travet, Mantorp
 Möjligheternas Arena, Umeå
 Romme Travbana, Borlänge
 Solvalla, Stockholm
 Strömsholm Galopp, Strömsholm
 Sundbyholm Racing Track, Eskilstuna
 Bro Park Galopp, Önsta
 Tingsryd Racing Track, Tingsryd (1609 meters; the only one in Northern Europe)
 Trav Gävleborg, Gävle
 Umåker Travet, Umeå
 Visby Travbana, Visby
 Örebro Travet, Örebro
 Östersund Travbana, Östersund

Switzerland
 Parkrennbahn Dielsdorf, Dielsdorf (near Zürich)
 Pferderennbahn Allmend, Frauenfeld
 Pferderennbahn IENA, Avenches
 Pferderennbahn Schachen, Aarau
 Winterrennbahn St. Moritz, the White Turf races were held in winter on the frozen St. Moritzersee

Thailand
 Royal Bangkok Sports Club, Bangkok
 Kawila Race Course, Chiang Mai
 Khon Kaen Race Course, Khon Kaen
 Nakhon Ratchasima Race Course   2nd Infantry Division, Nakhon Ratchasima
 Udon Thani Race Course, Udon Thani

Trinidad and Tobago
 Santa Rosa Park, Arima

Turkey
 Ankara 75th Anniversary Race Course, Ankara
 Diyarbakır Race Course, Diyarbakır
 Elazığ Race Course, Elazığ
 Kocaeli Race Course, Kocaeli
 Osmangazi Race Course, Bursa
 Şanliurfa Race Course, Şanlıurfa
 Şirinyer Race Course, Izmir
 Veliefendi Race Course, Istanbul
 Yeşiloba Race Course, Adana

Ukraine
 Kyiv Ippodrom, Kyiv

United Arab Emirates
 Abu Dhabi Equestrian Club, Abu Dhabi
 Jebel Ali Racecourse, Jebel Ali (near Dubai)
 Meydan Racecourse, Dubai

United States

Thoroughbred racing

Arizona
 Arizona Downs, Prescott Valley
 Rillito Park Racetrack, Tucson
 Turf Paradise, Phoenix

Arkansas
 Oaklawn Park, Hot Springs

California

 California Association of Racing Fairs (various fair meetings across Northern California)
 Del Mar Racetrack, Del Mar
 Fresno Race Track, Fresno
 Golden Gate Fields, Albany
 Los Alamitos, Los Alamitos
 Santa Anita Park, Arcadia

Colorado
 Arapahoe Park, Aurora

Delaware
 Delaware Park, Wilmington

Florida
 Gulfstream Park, Hallandale Beach
 Hialeah Park Race Track, Hialeah 
 Tampa Bay Downs, Tampa

Idaho
 Idaho Downs at Expo Idaho, Boise

Illinois
 (Fan Duel Racetrack), Collinsville
 Hawthorne Race Course, Cicero

Indiana
 Horseshoe Indianapolis, Shelbyville

Iowa
 Prairie Meadows, Altoona

Kentucky
 Churchill Downs, Louisville (site of the Kentucky Derby), (first jewel in the "Triple Crown" of thoroughbred horse racing)
 Ellis Park Race Course, Henderson
 Keeneland Race Course, Lexington
 Kentucky Downs, Franklin
 Turfway Park, Florence

Louisiana
 Delta Downs, Vinton
 Evangeline Downs, Opelousas
 Fair Grounds, New Orleans
 Louisiana Downs, Bossier City

Maryland
 Laurel Park (race course), Laurel
 Maryland State Fairgrounds, Timonium (only held during state fair, late August-early September)
 Pimlico Race Course, Baltimore (site of the Preakness Stakes, second jewel in the "Triple Crown" of thoroughbred horse racing, since 1873)

Massachusetts
 Suffolk Downs, East Boston CLOSED as of June 2019.

Michigan
Northville Downs, Northville Michigan

Minnesota
 Canterbury Park, Shakopee

Nebraska
 Columbus Races, Columbus
 Fonner Park, Grand Island
 Horsemen's Park, Omaha
 Lincoln Race Course, Lincoln

New Jersey

 Meadowlands Racetrack, East Rutherford
 Monmouth Park Racetrack, Oceanport

New Mexico
 Albuquerque Downs, Albuquerque
 Ruidoso Downs, Ruidoso Downs
 Sunland Park, Sunland Park
 SunRay Gaming, Farmington
 Zia Park, Hobbs

New York
 Aqueduct Racetrack, Jamaica, Queens, New York City
 Belmont Park, Elmont (site of Belmont Stakes), (third jewel in the "Triple Crown" of thoroughbred horse racing)
 Finger Lakes Gaming and Race Track, Canandaigua
 Saratoga Race Course, Saratoga Springs

North Dakota
 North Dakota Horse Park, Fargo

Ohio
 Belterra Park, Cincinnati
 Hollywood Gaming at Mahoning Valley Race Course, Youngstown
 Thistledown Racino, North Randall

Oklahoma
 Fair Meadows Race Track, Tulsa
 Remington Park, Oklahoma City
 Will Rogers Downs, Claremore

Oregon
 Grants Pass Downs, Grants Pass

Pennsylvania
 Parx Casino and Racing, Bensalem Township
 Hollywood Casino at Penn National Race Course, Grantville
 Presque Isle Downs, Erie

Texas
 Lone Star Park, Grand Prairie
 Retama Park, Selma
 Sam Houston Race Park, Houston

Virginia
 Colonial Downs, New Kent County

Washington
 Emerald Downs, Auburn

West Virginia
 Charles Town Races & Slots, Charles Town
 Mountaineer Casino, Racetrack and Resort, Chester

Wyoming
 Wyoming Downs, Evanston

Harness racing
Note: Harness racing is often conducted for short-term meets at various fairs and similar events. Many notable harness races are held at such venues, such as the Fox Stake at the Indiana State Fair and the Little Brown Jug at the Delaware County Fairgrounds in Delaware, Ohio.

California
 Cal Expo, Sacramento

Delaware
 Dover Downs, Dover
 Harrington Raceway & Casino, Harrington

Florida
 Pompano Park, Pompano Beach

Illinois
 Hawthorne Race Course, Stickney/Cicero (also conducts thoroughbred racing)

Indiana
 Hoosier Park, Anderson

Kentucky
 The Red Mile, Lexington
 Oak Grove (racecourse), Oak Grove

Maine
 Bangor Raceway, Bangor
 First Tracks Cumberland, Cumberland

Maryland
 Ocean Downs, Berlin
 Rosecroft Raceway, Oxon Hill

Massachusetts
 Plainridge Racecourse, Plainville

Michigan
 Northville Downs, Northville

Minnesota
 Running Aces Harness Park, Columbus

New Jersey
 Freehold Raceway, Freehold
 Meadowlands Racetrack, East Rutherford

New York
 Batavia Downs, Batavia
 Buffalo Raceway, Hamburg
 Historic Track, Goshen
 Monticello Raceway, Sullivan County
 Saratoga Raceway, Saratoga Springs
 Tioga Downs, Nichols
 Vernon Downs, Vernon
 Yonkers Raceway, Yonkers

Ohio
 MGM Northfield Park, Northfield
 Hollywood Gaming at Dayton Raceway, Dayton 
 Miami Valley Gaming, Lebanon
 Scioto Downs Racino, Columbus
 Delaware County Fairgrounds, Delaware

Pennsylvania
 Harrah's Philadelphia, Chester
 Hollywood Casino at The Meadows, North Strabane Township
 Mohegan Pennsylvania, Wilkes-Barre

Uruguay
 Hipodromo Municipal de Las Piedras, Las Piedras
 Hipodromo Nacional de Maroñas, Montevideo

Venezuela
 Hipodromo de Santa Rita, Santa Rita, Zulia (near Maracaibo)
 Hipodromo de Valencia, Valencia, Carabobo
 Hipodromo La Rinconada, Caracas
 Hipodromo Rancho Alegre, Ciudad Bolívar, Bolívar

Vietnam
 Phú Thọ Hippodrome, Ho Chi Minh City

Zimbabwe
 Borrowdale Park, Harare

See also
List of horse racing venues by capacity

External links
Hundreds more Australian racetracks – selectracing.com.au

References 

Horse racing-related lists

Horse racing